Earl House may refer to:

Thomas Earl House (Napa, California), listed on the National Register of Historic Places in Napa County, California
Thomas Earl House (Ann Arbor, Michigan), listed on the National Register of Historic Places in Washtenaw County, Michigan
Vienna and Earl Apartment Buildings, St. Paul, Minnesota, listed on the NRHP in Minnesota
Jephtha Earl Cobblestone Farmhouse, Benton, New York, listed on the NRHP in Yates County, New York
Earl-Rochelle House, Texarkana, Texas, listed on the National Register of Historic Places in Bowie County, Texas

See also
Thomas Earl House (disambiguation)
Earle House (disambiguation)